The College Hill Historic District is a historic neighborhood in Maryville, Tennessee. It is a local historic district; a portion of the area along Indiana Avenue is also listed on the National Register of Historic Places as the Indiana Avenue Historic District.

References

Victorian architecture in Tennessee
Colonial Revival architecture in Tennessee
Buildings and structures in Blount County, Tennessee
Historic districts on the National Register of Historic Places in Tennessee
National Register of Historic Places in Blount County, Tennessee